General elections were held in Suriname on 15 March 1967. The result was a victory for the National Party of Suriname, which won 17 of the 39 seats.

Results

References

Suriname
Elections in Suriname
1967 in Suriname
Suriname
Election and referendum articles with incomplete results